The big-head schizothoracin (Aspiorhynchus laticeps) is a species of fish in the family Cyprinidae. It is found only in Bosten Lake and the Yarkand River in Xinjiang, China. It is the only member of its genus.

See also
 List of endangered and protected species of China

References

Cyprinid fish of Asia
Endemic fauna of China
Freshwater fish of China
Biota of Xinjiang
Endangered fish
Endangered fauna of Asia
Fish described in 1877
Endangered Fauna of China